Ahmet Hromadžić (11 October 1923 – 1 January 2003) was a Bosnian writer.

Bibliography
Labudova poljana, novel, Sarajevo, 1952. 
Patuljak iz Zaboravljene zemlje, novel, Sarajevo, 1956. 
Patuljak vam priča, short stories, Sarajevo, 1957. 
Okamenjeni vukovi, novel, Sarajevo, 1963. 
Dječji pisci o sebi,( I, II, III ) prose, Sarajevo 1963.
Bijeli cvijet, short stories, Sarajevo, 1965. 
Zlatorun, short stories, Sarajevo, 1966.
Zelengor, short stories, Sarajevo, 1971. 
Bistri potoci, novel, Sarajevo, 1971. 
Bijeli slavuj, short stories, Sarajevo, 1972. 
Dječak jaše konja, novel, Sarajevo 1977. 
Ledena gora, picture book, Sarajevo 1977.
Patuljak iz zaboravljene zemlje, drama, Sarajevo, 1980.

1923 births
2003 deaths
People from Bosanski Petrovac
Bosnia and Herzegovina writers
Yugoslav writers
20th-century male writers
20th-century Bosnia and Herzegovina writers